Michelle Caruso-Cabrera (born February 9, 1967) is an American politician and journalist. She was a regular CNBC contributor for two decades, including as co-host of Power Lunch and Worldwide Exchange. She unsuccessfully ran for the Democratic nomination for the 2021 New York City Comptroller election.

A registered member of the Republican Party through 2015, Caruso-Cabrera switched and registered as a Democrat in 2016. She moved to Queens in 2019 and challenged incumbent Representative Alexandria Ocasio-Cortez in the 2020 Democratic primary for New York's 14th congressional district, which covers portions of the Bronx and Queens. She received support from the Greater New York Chamber of Commerce for her candidacy, but was defeated in the primary after receiving 18.2% of the vote and coming in second, and came in third with 0.9% in the general election after becoming the candidate of the Serve America Movement.

Early life and education
Caruso-Cabrera was born in Dayton, Ohio and raised in Nashua, New Hampshire. Her grandparents were Italian and Cuban immigrants. She graduated from Nashua High School in 1987. She attended Wellesley College ('91) in Massachusetts, paying her tuition in part with the help of a National Merit Scholarship and her earnings from her first summer job as a waitress at Pizza Hut. She obtained a bachelor's degree in Economics. Prior to graduation, she was elected editor of the college newspaper, and starting in 1991 she worked as a stringer for The New York Times, reporting for the education section.

Career

Journalism

Caruso-Cabrera was a researcher and later a special projects producer for Univision from 1991 to 1994, where she was a producer on a team that won an Emmy Award for a five-part series on children with AIDS. She then worked as a reporter for WTSP in St. Petersburg, Florida, from 1994 to 1998.

She joined CNBC in August 1998, working there until January 2019, and became the network's first Hispanic anchor in 2001. Caruso-Cabrera co-anchored Power Lunch with Bill Griffeth from 2002 to 2003. She received a Broadcast Journalist of the Year (2004) award from the National Association of Hispanic Journalists. She co-hosted the Worldwide Exchange program in 2005-07, along with Christine Tan in Asia and Ross Westgate in Europe. Caruso-Cabrera began appearing regularly on Power Lunch in 2009 in an analyst capacity. She was promoted to co-presenter of Power Lunch in 2009, and remained in that position until 2013. She rejoined Power Lunch for her third stint as co-presenter in 2016.

She left CNBC in September 2018 to join the board of directors of a Dallas, Texas, financial firm. Caruso-Cabrera held that position until February 2020.

Book
As a registered Republican, Caruso-Cabrera wrote a book in 2010 entitled You Know I'm Right: More Prosperity, Less Government. In it, she called for the elimination of both Social Security and Medicare, which she characterized as "pyramid schemes", and expressed numerous other conservative positions. Caruso-Cabrera also said she wanted to abolish the federal United States Department of Commerce, United States Department of Education, United States Department of Energy, and United States Department of Labor, as well as the U.S. Securities and Exchange Commission. She urged that insider trading be made legal. In addition, she proposed creating personal savings accounts saying they would lead people to work longer, and converting Medicare into a corporate-type 401(k) plan. The book has a foreword by CNBC colleague Larry Kudlow, who later became President Donald Trump's National Economic Council director.

In 2020, four years after switching away from the Republican Party, to become a registered Democrat, Caruso-Cabrera tweeted, "I support Medicare and social security-its important to take care of [sic] the most vulnerable. Medicare fo all is taking health insurance away from people who have health insurance that they already like."

Politics

A registered member of the Republican Party through 2015, Caruso-Cabrera switched and registered as a Democrat in 2016.

2020 US House campaign 

Caruso-Cabrera filed official paperwork on February 10, 2020, challenging freshman Representative Alexandria Ocasio-Cortez in the Democratic primary for New York's 14th congressional district, which covers portions of the Bronx and Queens. Caruso-Cabrera was endorsed by what Politico called the "traditionally conservative" United States Chamber of Commerce, a business lobbying group that generally backs Republicans. On April 8, her staff reported that Caruso-Cabrera's campaign had raised $1 million, and it was reported that over four dozen finance industry professionals, including private equity executives and investment bankers, had made early donations to Caruso-Cabrera. In the primary she received 11,337 votes, 18.2% of the vote, finishing in second place.  	

Caruso-Cabrera ran in the general election on the ticket of the Serve America Movement, a party with 349 registered members in New York. She received 2,000 votes, or 0.9%, finishing in last place.

2021 NYC Comptroller campaign

Caruso-Cabrera ran for election in the 2021 New York City Comptroller race. She ran in the Democratic primary against among others NYS Senator Brian Benjamin, entrepreneur and former US Marine Zach Iscol, NYC Councilmember Brad Lander, NYS Senator Kevin Parker, and NYS Assemblymember David Weprin.

As of May 25, 2021, she was 6th among the candidates in fundraising, having raised $917,000 in campaign contributions (though that included $300,000 that she personally lent her own campaign). She had $248,000 left, and had not met the threshold to receive public matching funds.

Personal life
As of 2007 she was married to Paulo Lima, and lived in Northern New Jersey. Caruso-Cabrera is now married to second husband Stephen Dizard, an investment banker and Republican Party donor who as of 2020 had donated over $400,000 to Republicans. The pair married in 2014. After living for several years in Trump International Hotel and Tower at Columbus Circle in Manhattan, in 2019 she moved with her husband to Sunnyside, Queens.

Electoral history

See also
 2020 United States House of Representatives elections in New York
 New Yorkers in journalism

References

External links
 
 

20th-century American journalists
21st-century American journalists
American business writers
American people of Cuban descent
American people of Italian descent
American women television journalists
Candidates in the 2021 United States elections
CNBC people
Living people
New York (state) Democrats
New York (state) Republicans
News & Documentary Emmy Award winners
Wellesley College alumni
Women business writers
20th-century American women
21st-century American women
1967 births
Candidates in the 2020 United States elections